ATP-binding cassette sub-family B member 7, mitochondrial is a protein that in humans is encoded by the ABCB7 gene.

Function 

The membrane-associated protein encoded by this gene is a member of the superfamily of ATP-binding cassette (ABC) transporters.  ABC proteins transport various molecules across extra- and intra-cellular membranes.  ABC genes are divided into seven distinct subfamilies (ABC1, MDR/TAP, MRP, ALD, OABP, GCN20, White).  This protein is a member of the MDR/TAP subfamily.  Members of the MDR/TAP subfamily are involved in multidrug resistance as well as antigen presentation.  This gene encodes a half-transporter involved in the transport of heme from the mitochondria to the cytosol.  With iron/sulfur cluster precursors as its substrates, this protein may play a role in metal homeostasis.

Clinical significance 

Mutations in this gene have been implicated in X-linked sideroblastic anemia with ataxia.

Interactions 

ABCB7 has been shown to interact with Ferrochelatase.

See also 
 ATP-binding cassette transporter

References

Further reading

External links 
  GeneReviews/NIH/NCBI/UW entry on X-Linked Sideroblastic Anemia and Ataxia
 
  
 

ATP-binding cassette transporters